Dahar Ka Balaji railway station is a small railway station in Jaipur district, Rajasthan. Its code is DKBJ. It serves Jaipur city on a broad-gauge line by Jaipur–Churu section. The station consists of three platforms. The platforms are well sheltered. It has many facilities including water and sanitation.

 the station is closed due to gauge conversion work on the rail route between Jaipur and Churu via Sikar.

Now from 22 Oct 2019, train services have started again between Jaipur and Sikar Junction. New DEMU train runs between Jaipur and Sikar Junction via Ringas Junction.

See also
 Jaipur district
 Durgapura railway station
 Gandhinagar Jaipur railway station
 Jaipur Junction railway station

References

External links

Railway stations in Jaipur district
Jaipur railway division